RPM was a Canadian magazine that published the best-performing singles of Canada from 1964 to 2000. During 1983, twenty-seven singles became number-one hits in Canada. Toni Basil commenced the year with her single "Mickey" while Paul McCartney and Michael Jackson's "Say Say Say" was 1983's final number one. Those who had previously reached number one on Canada's chart were Marvin Gaye, Michael Jackson, Styx, The Police, Elton John, Bonnie Tyler, Kenny Rogers, Dolly Parton, Lionel Richie, and Paul McCartney. No Canadians reached the summit in 1983.

The most successful artist of the year based on the number of chart-toppers and weeks spent at number one was Michael Jackson. He gained his first Canadian number-one hit this year with "Billie Jean" in March, then attained the chart's top position three more times with "Beat It" in May, "Wanna Be Startin' Somethin'" in July, and "Say Say Say" in December. In total, Jackson remained at number one for 10 weeks during 1983. Despite this success, it was British band The Police that achieved the best-performing hit of 1983, "Every Breath You Take", which stayed at number one on the issues of 2 July and 9 July.

Alongside Jackson, The Police were also the only act to peak at number one more than once, rising to the top again in October with "King of Pain". Together with "Every Breath You Take", the band remained at number one for three issues. Toni Basil's "Mickey", Musical Youth's "Pass the Dutchie", Michael Jackson's "Beat It", Irene Cara's "Flashdance... What a Feeling", Michael Sembello's "Maniac", Lionel Richie's "All Night Long (All Night)", and Paul McCartney and Michael Jackson's "Say Say Say" were the seven tracks that stayed at number one for at least three weeks.

Chart history

Notes

See also
1983 in music

List of Billboard Hot 100 number ones of 1983 by Billboard
List of Cash Box Top 100 number-one singles of 1983 by Cashbox
List of Canadian number-one albums of 1983

References

External links
 Read about RPM Magazine at the AV Trust
 Search RPM charts here at Library and Archives Canada

 
1983 record charts
1983